Nimrod is an unincorporated community in Perry County, Arkansas, United States.

The Fourche LaFave River Bridge and the Wallace Bridge, which are listed on the National Register of Historic Places, are near the community.

References

Unincorporated communities in Perry County, Arkansas
Unincorporated communities in Arkansas